Pisaryovka is a rural locality (a khutor) in Kondrashovskoye Rural Settlement, Ilovlinsky District, Volgograd Oblast, Russia. The population was 382 as of 2010. There are 8 streets.

Geography 
Pisaryovka is located in steppe, on the banks of the Shiryay River, on the Volga Upland, 28 km northeast of Ilovlya (the district's administrative centre) by road. Alikovka is the nearest rural locality.

References 

Rural localities in Ilovlinsky District